Sam Lin (born October 1, 1993) is Taiwanese actor and singer. He was a first generation member of the Taiwanese boy group SpeXial, from 2012 to 2020. In 2019, he formed the music duo, the Dragon Tiger Brothers, with his SpeXial bandmate Brent Hsu.

Biography
Sam and his high school friend Brent were both discovered by talent agency Comic Communications, which were in the midst of producing a four-member boy band to succeed Fahrenheit. After successfully winning a series of auditions, both Sam and Brent were selected to be part of the first generation of SpeXial, alongside Wes Lo and Wayne Huang. Sam's position in the group was center and rapper.

SpeXial debuted on December 7, 2012 with the release of their self-titled debut album. Sam and Brent also starred as main characters in the Taiwanese drama KO One Return (2012), to promote the group's release. Sam went on to star in its sequel KO One Re-act (2013) and the spin-off K.O. 3AN-GUO (2017), alongside other SpeXial members.

On May 15, 2015, Sam temporarily left SpeXial to fulfill his compulsory military service. He was honorably discharged on May 14, 2016. He had his comeback stage on May 21, 2016 at the SpeXial Land 2016 concert. From 2017 to 2019, Sam was a co-host on the entertainment variety show, Showbiz. The Taiwanese idol drama Five Missions (2018) was Sam's first drama as lead actor separate from his projects with SpeXial.

In May 2020, Sam announced that he has joined a new management TVBS, officially marking his departure from SpeXial.

In 2021, he starred in the popular BL web drama series We Best Love.

Filmography

Film

Television series

Web series

Variety shows

References

External links
 Sam Lin on Instagram

1993 births
Living people
Taiwanese actors
Taiwanese rappers
Taiwanese television personalities
21st-century Taiwanese  male singers